Barry Brennan is a Gaelic footballer from County Laois.

He plays for the Graiguecullen club. He usually plays in the forwards for Laois and in 2003 was part of the Laois squad that won the Leinster Senior Football Championship title for the first time since 1946.

Brennan is son of former Graiguecullen and Laois senior football star, Willie Brennan, winner of a National Football League medal with Laois in 1986.

External links
Laois Nationalist
Laois on Hoganstand.com
Irish Independent article

Year of birth missing (living people)
Living people
Graiguecullen Gaelic footballers
Laois inter-county Gaelic footballers